Lorry Girl is a 2012 Malayalam short film written and directed by Pampally and produced by Pampally Productions. This short film is one has a social message for modern society. It has been screened worldwide on 1 December 2012, World AIDS Day, at 14 centers in Kerala, and in all main cities in India and in many countries around the world.

Plot 

Lorry Girl tells the story of a prostitute Lakshmi, who sells her body to lorry drivers, out of helplessness rather than choice. She is a compassionate woman, and she is in love with Kannan, a lorry driver. She is very protective of her only daughter Kani. The plot revolves around the relations of Kannan-lakshmi-kani.

Lorry Girl was created specifically to instill awareness of the need to eradicate AIDS and stresses the need of using condoms.

Cast 

The leading characters of Lorry Girl are Lachu (Lakshmi), Kannan and Kani. The main character Lakshmi is played by Rani Sharan.

Preview on World Aids Day 

The Lorry Girl has been shown at more than 30 centres, all at 6.30 PM on the 1st day of December, 2012, World AIDS Day.

References

External links 
Official film website

2012 films
Films shot in Kerala
Films shot in Palakkad